Lawrence from the kindred Atyusz (died after 1224) was a Hungarian noble, who served as Judge royal for a short time in 1222, during the reign of Andrew II of Hungary.

He was born into the Atyusz kindred as the second son of Atyusz II. His older brother was Atyusz III, who also functioned as Judge royal from 1215 to 1217. Former genealogical works referred to Lawrence incorrectly as the child of Atyusz III. Lawrence had no descendants.

Lawrence had participated in the Fifth Crusade and was also appointed Master of the cupbearers by King Andrew II in 1217, replacing the Hont-Pázmány brothers, Sebes and Alexander. He held the office until 1221, beside that he also served as ispán of Újvár and Keve Counties in 1221. According to historian Attila Zsoldos, he was elected Judge royal for a short time in 1222, during the nobles' resistance movement which soon evolved into the forced issuance of the Golden Bull of 1222 by Andrew II. He also functioned as head of Nyitra County in 1222. However he was soon replaced by his cousin, Solomon as Judge royal. Lawrence held the office of ispán of Újvár County for the second time between 1222 and 1224.

References

Sources

 

Lawrence
13th-century Hungarian people
Judges royal
Christians of the Fifth Crusade
Masters of the cupbearers